Seyfabad-e Bozorg (also Romanized as Seyfābād-e Bozorg; also known as Seyfābād and Seyfābād-e Pol-e Kordān) was a village in Saidabad Rural District, in the Central District of Savojbolagh County, Alborz Province, Iran. At the 2006 census, its population was 5,764, in 1,494 families.  It was joined with Seyfabad-e Khaleseh to form the city of Golsar.

References 

Populated places in Savojbolagh County